SunSITE (Sun Software, Information & Technology Exchange) is a network of Internet servers providing archives of information, software and other publicly available resources. The project, started in the early 1990s, is run by a number of universities worldwide and was initially co-sponsored by Sun Microsystems.

The more notable SunSITEs include:
 SunSITE Canada, operated by University of British Columbia = Found Without Content - 2022.04.28
 SunSITE Central Europe, operated by RWTH Aachen, Germany
 Sun SITE Central Europe Workshop Proceedings  (CEUR-WS.org) Free Open-Access
 SunSITE Poland, operated by ICM, University of Warsaw

Some former SunSITEs:
 SunSITE Chile
 SunSITE Czech Republic, operated by School of Computer Science, Charles University, Prague = Server Not Found - 2022.04.28
 SunSITE Denmark, now running as dotsrc.org Open Source Hosting
 SunSITE Mexico = Blank Page - 2022.04.28
 SunSITE North Carolina, operated by University of North Carolina at Chapel Hill, now running as Ibiblio
 SunSITE RedIris (Spain), operated by Spanish National Research Network = Server Not Found - 2022.04.28
 SunSITE Singapore, operated by National University of Singapore = Blank Page - 2022.04.28
 SunSITE Switzerland, operated by SWITCH Information Technology Services, now running as SWITCHmirror
 SunSITE Tennessee operated by University of Tennessee, Knoxville = Server Not Found - 2022.04.28
 SunSITE Thailand operated by Assumption University, Bangkok = Server Not Found - 2022.04.28
 University of Alberta SunSITE, now running as the University of Alberta Digital Object Repository (UADORe)

No longer in operation:
 SunSITE Austria, operated by University of Vienna 
 SunSITE Argentina, operated by Universidad de Buenos Aires.
 Berkeley Digital Library SunSITE, University of California, Berkeley Libraries
 SunSITE Hungary, run by Institute of Mathematics, University of Debrecen
 SunSITE Indonesia, operated by Faculty of Computer Science, University of Indonesia, Jakarta
 SunSITE Japan
 SunSITE South Africa, operated by University of Witwatersrand, Johannesburg
 SunSITE UK, operated by Imperial College Department of Computing.

Academic computer network organizations
Servers (computing)
Sun Microsystems